The Brihanmumbai Mahanagar Palika election, 2017 (Brihanmumbai Municipal Corporation election, 2017) is an election of members to the Brihanmumbai Municipal Corporation which governs Greater Mumbai, the largest city in India. It took place on 21 February 2017. Total Voters was 91,80,654.

Schedule 
Brihanmumbai Mahanagar Palika election was held on 21 February 2017 in a single phase. Results were announced on 23 February 2017.

Result
The ruling Shiv Sena was voted as the largest party in elections. BJP did immensely well by jumping from 31 to 82 seats. No Party could get a clear majority, however, later BJP supported Shiv Sena for the Mayor post. Indian National Congress had fallen to 31 seats, while Maharashtra Navnirman Sena dropped to 7 seats.

References

Brihanmumbai Municipal Corporation
2017 elections in India
Mumbai